The orange-crowned toadlet (Pseudophryne occidentalis), or western toadlet, is a species of frog in the family Myobatrachidae. It is endemic to Australia. Its natural habitats are temperate shrubland, Mediterranean-type shrubby vegetation, intermittent rivers, intermittent freshwater lakes, freshwater marshes, intermittent freshwater marshes, and rocky areas.

References

Pseudophryne
Amphibians of South Australia
Amphibians of Western Australia
Taxonomy articles created by Polbot
Amphibians described in 1940
Frogs of Australia